Maarten Schops (born 3 April 1976) is a Belgian former footballer, who played as a defensive midfielder.

Club career
Schops started out with Belgian club Lommel. In 1996, he joined Dutch side Roda JC, where he won the KNVB Cup in his first season, scoring in the final. During the second half of the 1997–98 season, he was loaned out to fellow Eredivisie team RKC Waalwijk, and in the summer of 1998, he made a permanent transfer to the club. In October 2000, Schops was loaned out to RBC Roosendaal for the remainder of the season, as his services were no longer needed at RKC Waalwijk. He subsequently had short periods playing for FC Zwolle (Eredivisie) and FC Den Bosch (Eerste Divisie) before leaving the Netherlands for Verbroedering Geel in his home country. In 2005, he moved to Germany, where he played in the lower leagues.

Honours
Roda JC
KNVB Cup: 1996–97

References

1976 births
Living people
Footballers from Flemish Brabant
Belgian footballers
Association football midfielders
K.F.C. Lommel S.K. players
Roda JC Kerkrade players
RKC Waalwijk players
RBC Roosendaal players
PEC Zwolle players
FC Den Bosch players
Eredivisie players
Eerste Divisie players
Belgian Pro League players
Challenger Pro League players
Belgian expatriate footballers
Expatriate footballers in the Netherlands
Belgian expatriate sportspeople in the Netherlands
Expatriate footballers in Germany
Belgian expatriate sportspeople in Germany
Sportspeople from Leuven